Rupert Villiers Minnett (2 September 1884 – 24 June 1974) was an Australian architect and sportsman. He played six first-class cricket matches for New South Wales between 1909/10 and 1914/15.

His two other brothers, Leslie and Roy, both played for New South Wales.

See also
 List of New South Wales representative cricketers

References

External links
 

1884 births
1974 deaths
People educated at Sydney Church of England Grammar School
Australian military personnel of World War I
Australian Flying Corps officers
New South Wales architects
Art Deco architects
Theatre architects
20th-century Australian architects
Australian cricketers
New South Wales cricketers
Cricketers from Sydney
L. G. Robinson's XI cricketers